G102 may refer to:
 China National Highway 102
 R-1820-G102, a model of the Wright R-1820 Cyclone aircraft engine
 , a German torpedo boat was sunk as a target by U.S. Army planes in 1921
 Grob G102 Astir, a single-seat glassfibre Standard Class sailplane

G.102 may refer to :
 Martinsyde G.102, a British First World War fighter bomber aircraft